András Szoszky (9 January 1887 – 24 October 1945) was a Hungarian wrestler. He competed in the featherweight event at the 1912 Summer Olympics.

Wrestling career
Szoszky started his competitive career in 1910. After two years, in 1912, Szosky took part in the Stockholm Summer Olympics in the featherweight event, part of the Olympics Wrestling Program, but was eliminated after two rounds receiving no awards. Success followed a year later in 1913 when he won the gold medal at the unofficial European Championships. Nearly a decade later he would go on to win the Hungarian title in 1921 before immigrating to the United States.

References

External links
 

1880s births
1945 deaths
People from Békéscsaba
Olympic wrestlers of Hungary
Wrestlers at the 1912 Summer Olympics
Hungarian male sport wrestlers
Sportspeople from Békés County
20th-century Hungarian people